is a trans-Neptunian object of the Kuiper belt, classified as a non-resonant cubewano, that measures approximately 270 kilometers in diameter.

Discovery 

It was discovered on 20 February 1999, by American and British astronomers Jane Luu, Chad Trujillo and David C. Jewitt at the U.S. Kitt Peak National Observatory in Arizona. As no precoveries were taken, the minor planet's observation arc begins with its discovery observation in 1999.

Classification and orbit 

The carbonaceous minor planet is a classical Kuiper belt object or "cubewano", which are not in an orbital resonance with Neptune and do not cross the giant planet's orbit. It orbits the Sun at a distance of 39.8–53.6 AU once every 319 years and 1 month (116,560 days). Its orbit has an eccentricity of 0.15 and an inclination of 10° with respect to the ecliptic. This makes it a relatively eccentric body for a classical Kuiper belt object, which typically have low-eccentricities of 0.10 or less.

Physical characteristics 

In February 2001, a rotational lightcurve was published for this minor planet from photometric observations by Portuguese astronomer Pedro Lacerda and the discovering astronomer Jane Luu. Lightcurve analysis gave a relatively short rotation period of  hours with a brightness variation of 0.40 magnitude.

The Collaborative Asteroid Lightcurve Link assumes a low albedo of 0.10 and calculates a mean-diameter of 265 kilometers, based on an absolute magnitude of 6.0, while the Johnston's archive give a diameter of 306 kilometers for an albedo of 0.09. Due to its small size, it is unlikely to be classified as a dwarf planet.

Numbering and naming 

This minor planet was numbered by the Minor Planet Center on 4 May 2004. As of 2018, it has not been named.

References

External links 
 List Of Transneptunian Objects, Minor Planet Center
 https://newton.spacedys.com/cgi-bin/astdys/astibo?objects:1999DF9;main
 Asteroid Lightcurve Database (LCDB), query form (info )
 Dictionary of Minor Planet Names, Google books
 Discovery Circumstances: Numbered Minor Planets (75001)-(80000) – Minor Planet Center
 
 

079983
079983
Discoveries by Chad Trujillo
Discoveries by David C. Jewitt
19990220